Robert Hambling is an Australian film director/editor, currently based in Sydney.

Having left school Hambling worked at the editing house, Roger Cherrills in Soho London. After a couple of years and gaining his union card he moved into music with stints at DJM music, Island Records and The Rolling stones Mobile.

He worked for Electric Wood/Wal Bass guitar before returning to film.

Hambling worked as an assistant editor on numerous feature films including Pink Floyd's The Wall (1982),  Greystoke: The Legend of Tarzan, Lord of the Apes (1984), King David (1985), Steaming (1985), Link (1986) and Aliens (1986).

More recently Hambling has worked in the popular music business. He has helped create music videos, concert films and documentaries for Cold Chisel, Midnight Oil, Jimmy Barnes, Divinyls, Silverchair, Missy Higgins, Don Walker, Superjesus, Jim Moginie, She Shinku, Rob Hirst, Ian Moss, Tex Don and Charlie, Margot Smith, Ghostwriters, Merrill Bainbridge, Paul Mac, Tambalane, Spy v Spy, Dragon, Shanley Del, Chicks Who Love Guns, Universe,  Mood Six, The Happening Thang, and many more.

Hambling directed several pieces for SBS television on Henry Rollins, Dig, Deborah Conway, Primus

He has directed two short films: 'Elvis' for Channel 4 television in the UK and 'Truth' with the AFC

He is particularly noted for his work with Silverchair and Cold Chisel

Silverchair 'Across the Night - The Creation of Diorama'

"Across the night" documented the making of Diorama, from the first rehearsal to the first performance, from Sydney to Los Angeles. The highs, the lows, and the eccentric Van Dyke Parks. It was released on DVD both here and in the USA

Silverchair 'Inside The Neon Ballroom'

"The making of "Neon Ballroom" and the surprising combination of Daniel Johns and David Helfgott. The one-hour special aired on television and was then released on DVD.

Silverchair  "Out Takes & Mistakes'

Young, on tour, in the studio, and goofing off. Released on VHS and now a fan club based release

Cold Chisel's 'Ringside' DVD (2003) Live Concert filmed at the Hordern Pavilion in 'the round'

Cold Chisel's 'The Live Tapes Vol. 1- Live At The Hordern Pavilion' DVD (2013)

Cold Chisel's 'The Live Tapes Vol. 3 - Live at The Sydney Entertainment Centre DVD (2015) released 2017

Midnight Oil 'Only The Strong - the Making of 10,9,8,7,6,5,4,3,2,1. A documentary about the recording of the album. Nick Launay and Jim Moginie, Rob Hirst, Peter Garrett

'The absolute first thing to watch, however, is the documentary Only the Strong: the making of 10, 9, 8, 7, 6, 5, 4, 3, 2, 1. If you're a fan of the Oils – and, as asserted earlier,

you won't have this thing if you're not – watching the double-act of Moginie and producer Nick Launay scamper through the multitracks of the album that made the band's

career is both fascinating and inspiring (so that's how they got the "sproing!" sound at the beginning of "US Forces"!), and the interviews with Peter Garrett and Rob Hirst are equally illuminating.'

His photography has appeared in numerous albums and articles.

Hambling during the early 1970s developed an imaginary soft cheese that tasted not dissimilar to Moose Cheese

Silverchair credits Hambling for helping the band in its early days by selecting their song Tomorrow in a demo competition where Hambling was a judge.

See also
 Silverchair Emotion Pictures
 Cold Chisel 'Vision'
 Cold Chseil 'The Perfect Crime' deluxe edition

Awards and nominations

ARIA Music Awards
The ARIA Music Awards is an annual awards ceremony that recognises excellence, innovation, and achievement across all genres of Australian music. They commenced in 1987. 

! 
|-
| 2021 ARIA Music Awards
| Robert Hambling for Midnight Oil's "First Nation"
| Best Video
| 
| 
|-

References

External links

 Trespass is a production facility for film director Robert Hambling

Australian music video directors
Living people
Year of birth missing (living people)